James Brudenell, 5th Earl of Cardigan (20 April 1725 – 24 February 1811), styled The Honourable James Brudenell until 1780 and known as The Lord Brudenell between 1780 and 1790, was a British courtier and politician who sat in the House of Commons from 1754 to 1780, when he was raised to the peerage as Baron Brudenell.

Background and education
Brudenell was born in London, England, the second son of George Brudenell, 3rd Earl of Cardigan, by Lady Elizabeth Bruce, daughter of Thomas Bruce, 3rd Earl of Elgin. He was the brother of George Montagu, 1st Duke of Montagu, the Honourable Robert Brudenell and Thomas Brudenell-Bruce, 1st Earl of Ailesbury. He was educated at Winchester College, Hampshire and matriculated at Oriel College, Oxford, from where he graduated in 1747 with a Bachelor of Arts degree.

Public life
Brudenell was Member of Parliament for Shaftesbury from 1754 to 1761, for Hastings from 1761 to 1768, for Great Bedwyn from March to November 1768 and for Marlborough 1768 to 1780. He served as Deputy Cofferer of the Household from 1755 to 1760, as Master of Robes to the Prince of Wales from 1758 to 1760, who acceded as King George III, and as Keeper of the Privy Purse from 1760 to 1811.

In 1780, he was raised to the peerage as Baron Brudenell, of Deene in the County of Northampton. Ten years later he inherited the earldom of Cardigan from his brother, George Montagu, 1st Duke of Montagu, the 4th Earl of Cardigan. In 1791 he was appointed Constable and Governor of Windsor Castle (succeeding his brother the Duke of Montagu), a post he held until his death.

Personal life
Lord Cardigan married the Honourable Anne Legge, daughter of George Legge, Viscount Lewisham (c. 1704 – 1732), in 1760. After her death in November 1786 he married secondly, aged 76, the 32-year-old Lady Elizabeth Waldegrave, daughter of John Waldegrave, 3rd Earl Waldegrave, in 1791. Both marriages were childless. He died at Grosvenor Square, Mayfair, London, in February 1811, aged 85. The barony of Brudenell created for him in 1780 died with him. The remaining titles passed to his nephew, Robert Brudenell, 6th Earl of Cardigan, son of Robert Brudenell. The Countess of Cardigan died at Seymour Place, Mayfair, London, in June 1823, aged 65.

References

G.E. Cokayne; with Vicary Gibbs, H.A. Doubleday, Geoffrey H. White, Duncan Warrand and Lord Howard de Walden, editors, The Complete Peerage of England, Scotland, Ireland, Great Britain and the United Kingdom, Extant, Extinct or Dormant, new ed., 13 volumes in 14 (1910–1959; reprint in 6 volumes, Gloucester, U.K.: Alan Sutton Publishing, 2000), volume III, page 15.

External links

1725 births
1811 deaths
People educated at Winchester College
Alumni of Oriel College, Oxford
Earls of Cardigan
British MPs 1754–1761
British MPs 1761–1768
British MPs 1768–1774
British MPs 1774–1780
Members of the Parliament of Great Britain for English constituencies
James
Peers of Great Britain created by George III